For the DC Comics character, see Lord Satanis

Satanis: The Devil's Mass is a 1970 American documentary film about Anton LaVey and the Church of Satan. It was directed and produced by Ray Laurent and released by Something Weird Video on 17 June 2003. Filmed in San Francisco, California, the film is a compilation of ritual footage and interviews with LaVey's family, neighbors, and church members, as well Christian priests and Mormon missionaries. Display ads at theater showings read: "Satanis is the most pertinent, and perhaps the most shocking film of our time. But it’s definitely not a movie for everyone. If you choose not to see it, we will understand.”

References

External links

Documentary films about religion in the United States
American documentary films
1970 films
Church of Satan
1970 documentary films
Documentary films about San Francisco
American exploitation films
Films about Satanism
1970s English-language films
1970s American films